The Meadow may refer to:
 The Meadow (painting), 1875 painting by Alfred Sisley
 The Meadow (play), 1947 radio drama by Ray Bradbury